Arem-arem is an Indonesian-Javanese snack made of compressed rice cake in the form of a cylinder wrapped inside a banana leaf, filled with diced vegetables, tempeh or oncom, sometimes also filled with minced meat or abon (beef floss), and eaten as snack. Arem-arem is often described as a smaller size lontong snack with fillings, thus sometimes also called lontong isi (lit. "filled lontong").

It is a common snack in Java, and commonly found in Indonesian marketplaces as jajan pasar ("market munchies") as a type of kue (snack) offered there. Arem-arem is often served as traditional ceremony, family gathering, birthday, office meetings, and often presented in a snack box. It is quite similar to lemper, but use regular rice instead of sticky rice lemper.

Variants and fillings
The rice is cooked with coconut milk, and stuffed with diced vegetables (carrot, common bean and potato), cooked minced meat (beef or chicken), abon (beef floss), or tofu, oncom and tempeh. There is a lot of arem-arem variants, mostly differ according to its fillings, the availability of ingredients, and also creativity of the creator.

Arem-arem is usually uses thin young banana leaf as wrapper, a thin light yellow-green colored banana leaf. Lontong on the other hand, usually uses thicker mature banana leaf. The texture of arem-arem snack is usually softer compared to those of common lontong or sticky lemper, due to thinner banana leaf, addition of coconut milk and prolonged steaming or boiling period.

See also

 Pastil
 Bakchang
 Burasa
 Lemper
 Lepet
Tamale
 Onigiri

References

External links 
 15 variations of Arem-arem recipes (In Indonesian)

Javanese cuisine
Indonesian snack foods
Indonesian rice dishes